Sheffield City Council elections took place on 5 May 2011. There were 28 seats up for election, one third of the council. The last election left the council with no overall control. Since the previous election, Liberal Democrat councillor Ben Curran, and Lib Dem-turned-independent Frank Taylor had defected to Labour leaving both parties equal at 41 councillors each. This election saw Labour regain control of the council that they lost in 2006, with nine gains from the Lib Dems. Overall turnout was 41.8%.

Councillors elected in 2007 Sheffield Council election defended their seats this year.

Election result

This result had the following consequences for the total number of seats on the Council after the elections:

Ward results

Arbourthorne

Beauchief & Greenhill

Beighton

Birley

Broomhill

Burngreave

Central

Crookes

Darnall

Dore & Totley

East Ecclesfield

Ecclesall

Firth Park

Fulwood

Gleadless Valley

Graves Park

Hillsborough

Manor Castle

Mosborough

Nether Edge

Richmond

Shiregreen & Brightside

Southey

Stannington

Stocksbridge & Upper Don

Walkley

West Ecclesfield

Woodhouse

References

2011 English local elections
2011
2010s in Sheffield